Konstantin Nikolai Freiherr von Stackelberg (tr. ; 30 March 1925) was a Baltic German composer and cavalry general in the Imperial Russian Army. Stackelberg was best known for his compositions on music about the White Army during the Russian Civil War. He was the head of the Imperial Music Choir from 1883 to 1917 (now the St. Petersburg Philharmonic Orchestra) and was also involved in improving the music in the Russian Army and Navy.

He was awarded Order of Prince Danilo I, Order of the Cross of Takovo and a number of other decorations.

References 

1848 births
1925 deaths
Recipients of the Order of the Cross of Takovo